Kiliroor Radhakrishnan (born 14 January 1944) is a short-story writer of Malayalam literature.

Biography
Radhakrishnan was born in Kiliroor near Kottayam in Kerala, India. He started writing in the 1960s. Some of his stories, particularly children's literature, were published in Malayalam. Radhakrishnan was the administrative manager and general manager of DC Books and Current Books from 1979 to 2002. He served as the chief editor of Amala Weekly (published for Malayalis abroad) and was the publication consultant for Poorna Publications. He also became a governing body member of State Children's Literature Institute.

Selected works
Radhakrishnan wrote more than 100 books, including short stories, novels, children's literature, and translations. The following is a selection of his works:
50 Vishwaprasidha Naadodikathakal
Ammayodoppam
Aanakadha
Daivathinte Simhasanam
Jathaka Kadhakal
Kuttikalude Aitheehyamaala
Nirangal
Ottayal Pattalam
Swarnathakkol
Vikramadithyakadhakal

Awards

Radhakrishnan received multiple awards for different works, including the following:

He received the K Thayat Award in 2015 and the Award of Kerala Government in 2017 for his comprehensive works.

References

1944 births
Living people
Malayali people
Indian male novelists
Indian male short story writers
Malayalam-language writers
Malayalam novelists
Malayalam short story writers
20th-century Indian short story writers
20th-century Indian novelists
21st-century Indian novelists
Novelists from Kerala
20th-century Indian male writers
21st-century Indian male writers
Recipients of the Kerala Sahitya Akademi Award